The 2018–19 French Guiana Régional 1 was the 58th season of the French Guiana Régional 1, the top division football competition in French Guiana. The season began on 1 September 2018.

League table

References

External links
Ligue de Guyane de Football

French Guiana Régional 1 seasons
French Guiana
1